Carbide iodides are mixed anion compounds containing iodide and carbide anions.
Many carbide iodides are cluster compounds, containing one, two or more carbon atoms in a core, surrounded by a layer of metal atoms, encased in a shell of iodide ions. These ions may be shared between clusters to form chains, double chains or layers.

The metal in carbide iodides is most often a rare earth element. Similar formulae tend to have similar structures. Where R is a rare earth element: R12C6I17 contains chains of R6 octahedra with a C26− core and a shell of iodide. R4I5C contains similar chains, but with a single C4− carbide atom. Double chain structures with single carbon atom cores include R6I7C2 and R3I3C. Layers of joined octahedra include R2I2C2 with an ethanide C24− core; R2I2C and R2IC with one carbide per octahedron.

Related compounds include the carbide chlorides, and carbide bromides. Carbon may be substituted by hydrogen, boron or nitrogen in the core of cluster compounds.

This list does not include cyanides, carbonyls, cyanamides or carbido borates, where carbon has bonds to other non-metals. However, there are carbide iodides that also contain nitride, oxide or other halides as well.

List
Do not confuse Cl for chlorine, and CI for carbon and iodine.

References

Carbides
Iodides
Mixed anion compounds